Lurøya is the largest island in Tiholmane, part of Thousand Islands, an island group south of Edgeøya.  It is part of the Norwegian territory of Svalbard.

References

 Norwegian Polar Institute Place Names of Svalbard Database

Islands of Svalbard